"Sambuca" is a song by British UK garage duo Wideboys, featuring Dennis G on vocals. It was released in October 2001 as a single, and was a top 20 hit, peaking at No. 15 on the UK Singles Chart and No. 1 on the UK Dance Singles Chart. Two later releases, "Sambuca 2006" and "Sambuca 2008" were released on the Garage Jams and All Around the World labels respectively, which featured more remixes of the track.

Capital Xtra included the song in their list of "The Best Old-School Garage Anthems of All Time".

Music video
The music video was directed by Shay Ola and premiered on 13 September 2001.

Track listing
UK CD maxi-single
 "Sambuca" (Original Radio Edit)
 "Sambuca" (Agent X Flaming Sambuca Remix)
 "Sambuca" (Wideboys Heavy Mix)

Charts

References

2001 songs
2001 singles
Wideboys songs
679 Artists singles
Locked On Records singles